Ognica may refer to the following places:

Wicko, Pomeranian Voivodeship, Gmina Wicko,  Pomeranian Voivodeship (north Poland)
Wicko, West Pomeranian Voivodeship, Gmina Międzyzdroje, West Pomeranian Voivodeship (north-west Poland)
Wicko (lake), Gmina Postomino, Sławno County, West Pomeranian Voivodeship, Poland